Lavô Tá Novo is the second album by the Brazilian hardcore punk band Raimundos. It was released in 1995 through Warner Music, and its producer was Mark Dearnley, who had already worked with AC/DC, Black Sabbath and Def Leppard previously. This album sold around four hundred thousand copies.

Track listing
"Tora Tora"
"Eu Quero Ver o Oco"
"Opa! Peraí, Caceta"
"O Pão da Minha Prima"
"Pitando no Kombão"
"Bestinha"
"Esporrei na Manivela"
"Tá Querendo Desquitar (Ela Tá Dando)"
"Sereia da Pedreira"
"I Saw You Saying (That You Say That You Saw)"
"Cabeça de Bode"
"Herbocinética"

Personnel
Raimundos
 Rodolfo - lead and background vocals, rhythm  (lead on "O Pão da Minha Prima" and "I Saw You Saying") guitar, percussion on "Tá Querendo Desquitar"
 Digão - lead and rhythm guitar, percussion on "Tá Querendo Desquitar", background vocals  (all except "Bestinha" and "Herbocinética"), co-lead vocals on "I Saw You Saying"
 Canisso - bass, background vocals on "Eu Quero Ver o Oco"
 Fred - drums

Additional musicians
 Rubão - vocal introduction on "Opa! Peraí, Caceta"
 TiquinhO, Hugo Hori, Marcelo - brass instruments on "Opa! Peraí, Caceta"
 Guilherme Bonolo - background vocals, percussion on "Tá Querendo Desquitar"
 Gabriel Thomaz - acoustic guitar and background vocals on "I Saw You Saying"
 Zenilton - accordion on "Esporrei na Manivela"; background vocals on  "Esporrei na Manivela" and "Tá Querendo Desquitar"
 Betinho - percussion on "Tá Querendo Desquitar"
 Bruno - percussion on "Tá Querendo Desquitar"
 X - rapping on "Cabeça de Bode"
 Gibi - scratches on "Cabeça de Bode"

Production
 Mark Dearnley - production, recording, mixing
 Paulo Junqueiro - A&R
 Guilherme Bonolo - production assistant
 Silas, Rico - recording assistants
 Brian Young - mixing assistant
 Roberto da Paixão - roadie
 Fernando Conssentino - drum tech
 José Muniz Neto - manager
 Cristina Doria - general coordination
 Stephen Marcussen - mastering

References

1995 albums
Raimundos albums